Kim Jones may refer to:
Kim Jones (runner) (born 1958), American long-distance runner
Kim Jones (artist) (born 1944), American performance artist
Kim Jones (designer) (born 1979), British menswear designer
Kim Jones (reporter) (born 1969), American sports reporter
Kim Jones (Sun), American managing director of Sun UK
Kimberly Jones (tennis) (born 1957), American tennis player
Kim Jones (digital creative) (born 1987), Australian digital creative
Lil' Kim (born 1974), American rap artist, born Kimberly Jones
Kimberly Jones, American author